Doran is a city in Wilkin County, Minnesota, United States. The population was 36 at the 2020 census.  It is part of the Wahpeton, ND-MN Micropolitan Statistical Area.

History
A post office called Doran was established in 1892, and remained in operation until 1989. The city was named for Michael Doran, a state legislator.

Notable person
Paul D. Aasness (1939-2017), farmer, businessman and politician, grew up on the family farm near Doran.

Geography

Doran is located at the junction of U.S. Route 75 and Minnesota State Highway 9.

Demographics

2010 census
As of the census of 2010, there were 55 people, 21 households and 14 families living in the city. The racial makeup was 100.0% White.

There were 21 households, of which 42.9% had children under the age of 18 living with them, 42.9% were married couples living together, 14.3% had a female householder with no husband present, 9.5% had a male householder with no wife present, and 33.3% were non-families. 23.8% of all households were made up of individuals, and 9.5% had someone living alone who was 65 years of age or older. The average household size was 2.62 and the average family size was 3.21.

The median age was 34.5 years. 29.1% of residents were under the age of 18; 5.5% were between the ages of 18 and 24; 23.6% were from 25 to 44; 36.4% were from 45 to 64; and 5.5% were 65 years of age or older. The gender makeup of the city was 49.1% male and 50.9% female.

2000 census
As of the census of 2000, there were 59 people, 24 households and 15 families living in the city. The racial makeup was 91.53% White, 1.69% African American, 1.69% Native American, and 5.08% from two or more races.

There were 24 households, of which 33.3% had children under the age of 18 living with them, 54.2% were married couples living together, 4.2% had a female householder with no husband present, and 37.5% were non-families. 29.2% of all households were made up of individuals, and 12.5% had someone living alone who was 65 years of age or older. The average household size was 2.46 and the average family size was 3.07.

18.6% of the population were under the age of 18, 11.9% from 18 to 24, 33.9% from 25 to 44, 22.0% from 45 to 64, and 13.6% who were 65 years of age or older. The median age was 40 years. For every 100 females, there were 96.7 males. For every 100 females age 18 and over, there were 108.7 males.

The median household income was $26,250 and the median family income was $56,250. Males had a median income of $30,833 and females $23,750. The per capita income was $15,959. There were 12.5% of families and 15.5% of the population living below the poverty line, including no under eighteens and none of those over 64.

References

Cities in Minnesota
Cities in Wilkin County, Minnesota
Wahpeton micropolitan area